The 2013 ACC Emerging Teams Cup was the first edition of the ACC Emerging Teams Asia Cup was held in Singapore. Eight teams participated in the tournament, comprising four under-23 teams from Test nations and four top associate teams from Asia.

Teams

Squads

Point table
Group-A 

Group-B

League stage

Group-A

Group-B

Knockout stage

Semifinal 1

Semifinal 2

Final

References

External links
 ACC EMERGING TEAMS CUP

Asian Cricket Council competitions